Fatih Yiğit Şanlıtürk (born 1 January 2003) is a Turkish professional footballer who plays as a midfielder for Turkish club Ümraniyespor.

Professional career
On 23 November 2020, Şanlıtürk signed a professional contract with Fenerbahçe. He made his professional debut with Fenerbahçe in a 3–0 Süper Lig win over BB Erzurumspor on 11 January 2021, at the age of 18. He scored his first goal in his UEFA Europa League debut in a 2-5 win against Finnish club HJK in the play-off round of the 2021–22 UEFA Europa League.

On 5 February 2022, Şanlıtürk signed a two-and-a-half-year deal with Ümraniyespor.

Career statistics

References

External links
 
 
 

2003 births
Living people
People from Bağcılar
Footballers from Istanbul
Turkish footballers
Turkey youth international footballers
Fenerbahçe S.K. footballers
Ümraniyespor footballers
Süper Lig players
Association football midfielders